Mike Sharpe (15 June 1956 – 11 December 2021) was a Bermudian sprinter. He competed in the men's 100 metres at the 1976 Summer Olympics. After retiring from sports, Sharpe became a news presenter for the Bermuda Broadcasting Company. He died in December 2021, at the age of 65.

References

External links
 

1956 births
2021 deaths
Athletes (track and field) at the 1974 British Commonwealth Games
Athletes (track and field) at the 1975 Pan American Games
Athletes (track and field) at the 1976 Summer Olympics
Bermudian male sprinters
Olympic athletes of Bermuda
Commonwealth Games competitors for Bermuda
Place of birth missing
Pan American Games competitors for Bermuda